Anna Hahn may refer to:
 Anna Marie Hahn (1906–1938), German-American murderer
 Anna Hahn (chess player) (born 1976), Latvian-American chess player